Demone Harris (born December 30, 1995) is an American football defensive end for the Houston Texans of the National Football League (NFL). Harris played college football at Buffalo.

Early life and amateur career

Harris attended Bishop Timon - St. Jude High School in Buffalo where he focused on basketball and did not play football until his junior year. Harris attended the University at Buffalo where he walked on to the football team and redshirted as a freshman. As a redshirt junior in 2017, he was nominated for the Burlsworth Trophy and named to the All-Mid-American Conference Second-team.

Professional career

Tampa Bay Buccaneers
Harris was signed by the Tampa Bay Buccaneers as an undrafted free agent on April 30, 2018. He was waived on September 1 and was signed to the practice squad the next day. He was promoted to the active roster on October 10 and made his NFL debut on October 14, playing four special teams snaps against the Atlanta Falcons. He was waived on November 16 and re-signed to the practice squad. He signed a reserve/future contract with the Buccaneers on December 31, 2018.

On October 5, 2019, Harris was waived by the Buccaneers and re-signed to the practice squad. He was released on October 15.

Baltimore Ravens
On October 22, 2019, Harris was signed to the Baltimore Ravens practice squad following an injury to Ravens linebacker Pernell McPhee.

Kansas City Chiefs
On November 21, 2019, Harris was signed by the Kansas City Chiefs off the Ravens practice squad. Harris played his first game for the Chiefs on December 8 at Gillette Stadium and recorded his first career tackle in the same game against Rex Burkhead of the New England Patriots. On February 2, 2020, Harris and the Chiefs won Super Bowl LIV 31–20 against the San Francisco 49ers. He was waived by the Chiefs on November 10, and re-signed to the practice squad two days later. Harris appeared in one game in the 2020 season, recording three tackles of Melvin Gordon in a blowout win over the Denver Broncos on October 25, 2020.

On February 9, 2021, Harris re-signed with the Chiefs. He was waived on August 31, 2021. He was signed to the practice squad the following day. He was elevated to the Chiefs' active roster via standard elevation on October 9, 2021. As part of standard elevation rules, he automatically reverted back to the practice squad after the game. He was elevated again the following week also via standard elevation on October 16, 2021. He was released on October 25, 2021.

Houston Texans
On November 10, 2021, Harris was signed to the Houston Texans practice squad. He signed a reserve/future contract with the Texans on January 11, 2022.

On August 30, 2022, Harris was waived by the Texans and signed to the practice squad the next day. He was promoted to the active roster on September 10, 2022. He was waived on November 2 and re-signed to the practice squad. He signed a reserve/future contract on January 11, 2023.

References

External links
Kansas City Chiefs bio
Buffalo Bulls bio

1995 births
Living people
African-American players of American football
American football defensive ends
Baltimore Ravens players
Buffalo Bulls football players
Houston Texans players
Kansas City Chiefs players
Players of American football from Buffalo, New York
Tampa Bay Buccaneers players
21st-century African-American sportspeople